Saint-Étienne-de-Gourgas (Languedocien: Sant Estève de Gorgàs) is a commune in the Hérault department in the Occitanie region in southern France.

Geography
Saint-Étienne-de-Gourgas is known for the "Cirque du Bout du Monde" which was formed from a meander in the Ruisseau de la Bronzinadouïre that cut deeply into the plateau of the Causse du Larzac leaving the monumental chalk cliffs.

Population

See also
Communes of the Hérault department

References

Communes of Hérault